Coin cleaning is the process of removing undesirable substances from a coin's surface in order to make it more attractive to potential buyers. The subject is disputed among the numismatic community whether cleaning coins is necessary. Those that argue in favor of cleaning are also in dispute on which methods work best. It was once common practice to clean coins as the method was recommended by experts in the field. Solutions from pencil erasers to wire brushes and potassium cyanide were all used as cleaning agents with the goal to make the coin look brilliant again. When certified grading came into use in the mid 1980s though, the practice of cleaning coins diminished over time. Most coin experts have since come out against cleaning coins, as doing so can negatively affect them both in grade and value. If a potentially valuable coin must be cleaned (for example if the coin is deformed) then professional work is recommended. Commonly found coins are mentioned as ideal candidates for any attempted cleaning experiments.

History
Coin cleaning has no definitive start date as when any object looks dirty people are usually inclined to clean it. The cleaning of coins though can be traced as far back as the mid 1800s in the United States when it came to Half cents and large cents. These coins soon became popular with collectors after they were discontinued in 1857 due to the rising costs of copper. Cleansers were used on the cents to try and make the coins mint red again. Another early example involves the Philadelphia coin cabinet. In 1903, many coins in the collection that had once been in proof condition were now partly covered in a white coating. An investigation found that the coins in the cabinet (displayed in the Philadelphia Mint since 1838) had at some point been cleaned by an attendant using purchased metal polish, as the coins were "tarnished". The cabinet today resides in the Smithsonian.

By the 1930s the motto "brilliant is best" was adopted by those in the coin collecting community. Coins that were toned were considered tarnished which caused collectors to brighten up their coins with things like abrasives. Penny boards were even made with instructions on how collectors should properly clean their coins by using a pencil eraser with a little bit of vinegar. The widespread practice of "improving" coins continued into the 1960s with advertisements on lotions and potions with the aim of making coins brilliant again. According to Q. David Bowers, collectors and coin dealers cleaned and dipped their coins then re-dipped them when the toning re-appeared as a result of these messages. Bowers estimated in 1960 that 90 to 95% of the Lincoln cents sold in the marketplace dated 1910 through the late 1920s were brilliant as a result of dipping. Coins that were cleaned also include the Indian Head cent, starting in the 1960s many now scarce dates were whizzed (see below) which later destroyed them of value. The widespread practice of coin cleaning lasted until the invention of certified and encapsulated grading in the early 1980s. When coins were finally viewed under the microscope and trained naked eye, the effects of treating coins were revealed to be less than ideal. Poorly cleaned coins are now labeled "Improperly Cleaned", which negatively affects their market value depending on severity.

Professional stance
Numerous known numismatists have given their opinions over the decades regarding coin cleaning. William H. Sheldon (creator of the Sheldon coin grading scale) wrote an opinion on cleaning old pennies stating: "Many a cent has been ruined in an attempt to improve it. Amateurs, and some who are not so amateur, are forever trying to improve the condition or appearance of an old cent." Richard Snow, who specializes in the field of Flying Eagle and Indian Head cents, wrote that some cleaning techniques could improve the surface of a coin. 

Snow does not suggest that people try these remedies but gives an "indication" of what could be done. He goes on to recommend in all instances that experiments be done on cheap bronze Lincoln cents (minted 1962 to 1982) and not valuable older coins. Scott A. Travers, author of the book The Insider's Guide to Coins Values states that a coin should never be cleaned as "many" collectors find them to be "repugnant". Travers also wrote that the idea of enhancing a coin's value through cleaning is a misconception. Kenneth Bressett and A. Kosoff also wrote opinions on the matter saying that once a coin has been "stripped" of its original surface and luster, it can "never be fully restored or made Uncirculated again". John J. Ford Jr. wrote an opinion regarding expertly cleaned coins saying that "while the result makes the coin look untouched, attractively colored coins should be left alone".

Methods
Listed below are some examples of how coins are cleaned. Coins with untouched original surfaces are generally more desirable than those that have been cleaned, although lightly cleaned coins with no damage done may still receive a normal coin grade. Improper cleaning can result in a coin's surface being damaged beyond repair, which is why expert attention is needed for potentially valuable coins. If a coin is shown to be damaged by cleaning then it will be marked as "Improperly Cleaned" or have a problem description by grading services.

Shipwreck finds
All items involved in shipwreck finds are documented and photographed in their before and after state to study any changes made by the restoration process. The cleaning process involves desalination in order to remove harmful salts that include chlorides. In the case of the Sveti Pavao shipwreck, the items involved were isolated in a polypropylene net and placed in tap water. The tap water was then exchanged and monitored until it was finally replaced by distilled water towards the end of the process. The items involved are then dried, and cleaned differently depending on the base metal of the object. Sea water is very corrosive and destructive to silver coins, their value is determined by their original condition as raised and by the conservation process. Gold coins on the other hand survive better underwater making their conservation process easier. 

Coins recovered from shipwrecks likely hold an appeal as historical artifacts that can be given the marketable status of "treasure". These coins have an added value only if they are determined to be genuine, as a majority of collectors do not want to own an illegal coin subject to seizure. The largest supply of American mint state gold coins have been recovered from shipwrecks in grades previously unknown to collectors.

See also
Coin grading
Sheldon coin grading scale
Coin storage

References

External links

Coins
Coin grading
Numismatics
Numismatic terminology